Shawnee Township may refer to the following places in the United States:

 Shawnee Township, Gallatin County, Illinois
 Shawnee Township, Fountain County, Indiana
 Shawnee Township, Cherokee County, Kansas
 Shawnee Township, Bates County, Missouri
 Shawnee Township, Cape Girardeau County, Missouri
 Shawnee Township, Henry County, Missouri
 Shawnee Township, Allen County, Ohio

See also

Shawnee (disambiguation)

Township name disambiguation pages